I, Me aur Main is a 2013 Indian Hindi romantic comedy film directed by debut film director Kapil Sharma. It features John Abraham, Prachi Desai and Chitrangada Singh in lead roles. It was released on 1 March 2013.

Plot
Ishaan, a charismatic, good-looking, self-centered, pompous, dependent, coquettish music producer from Mumbai, lives a sheltered existence as the apple of his mother's eye, always protected by his elder sister Shivani. He lives with his girlfriend Anushka and takes her for granted. One day Anushka kicks him out of her house due to his irresponsibility about their relationship.

His new neighbor Gauri comes into his life, and he begins to fall in love with her. Ishaan is forced out of his company, and Gauri encourages him to start his own music company. While Ishaan is working on his music, Anushka is pregnant with his child but decides not to tell him that he is responsible. A few days later, Ishaan learned that his ex-girlfriend is pregnant with his child. Gauri gets a scholarship to Paris, and Ishaan and Gauri decide to live there after his big launch.

On the day of the launch, Anushka starts having contractions, and Ishaan, realizing his responsibilities, takes Anushka to the hospital where they have a daughter. Gauri leaves for Paris, understanding what is happening. Eight months later, Ishaan and his baby girl Diya talk to Gauri, who is returning soon, while Anushka is happily married to another man.

Cast

 John Abraham as Ishaan Sabharwal Music Producer  
 Prachi Desai as Gauri Dandekar
 Chitrangada Singh as Anushka Lal
 Zarina Wahab as Nisha Sabharwal, Ishaan's mother
 Priyanka Sharma as Taruni
 Errol Peter Marks as Tarun Mehra, Ishaan's best friend
 Raima Sen as Beena Chandok
 Sameer Soni as Agastya (in a special appearance)
 Sheena Shahabadi as Amala
 Deepti Gujral as Mrinalini
 Mini Mathur as Shivani Sabharwal, Ishaan's sister
 Sai Gundewar as Rafiq
 Amar Talwar as Mr. Sabharwal, Ishaan's father
 Micky Makhija as Mr. Narayan
 Mukul Chadda as Adil, Ishaan's brother-in-law
 Krish Chatterji as Rishi, Adil and Shivani's son
 Arlette Evita Grao as Shona
 Yugesh Anil as Gauri's friend
 Gyanesh as Akshay Tanwar

Release
The film was earlier expected to release in December 2012; it was pushed to March 2013. The theatrical trailer was released on 28 January 2013.

Critical reception
I, Me aur Main received mixed-to-negative reviews from critics. Alisha Coelho of in.com gave 3.5 stars out of 5 and said that the movie was "proof that a movie with John Abraham as the lead can be your time and money's worth and that Bollywood can (if it tried) make love stories that don't defy common sense and good taste."
Nishi Tiwari for Rediff.com has given 2/5 stars and says I, Me Aur Main has its moments but falters badly with its plot.
Simon Foster for sbs.com.au has given 2/5 stars and says "Action Man Fails To Make Dramatic Jump.

Box office
I, Me, Aur Main opened to poor collections. The film had little growth on the weekend, but the collections were still low and was eventually declared a flop.

Soundtrack

One song from Sridevi starrer 1989 Bollywood comedy film ChaalBaaz "Na Jaane Kahan Se Aayi Hai" was re-created in the film. The album consists of seven tracks composed by four musicians — Sachin–Jigar, Gourov Dasgupta, Pakistani artist Falak Shabir and Raghav Sachar. Musicperk.com rated the album 7.5/10 quoting "Saajna, Naa Jaane, Darbadar (written by Mayur Puri), Meri Jaaniye are the picks of the album." The track "Capuchino" was a rip-off from the original song "I'm Shipping Up to Boston" and the track "Na Jaane" is a rip-off of "Part-Time Lover" a 1985 single by Stevie Wonder, from his album In Square Circle.

Track list

References

External links

 

2010s Hindi-language films
2013 romantic comedy films
2013 films
Films scored by Sachin–Jigar
Indian romantic comedy films
Rose Audio Visuals
Reliance Entertainment films